Wilczków  is a village in the administrative district of Gmina Żórawina, within Wrocław County, Lower Silesian Voivodeship, in south-western Poland. Prior to 1945 it was in Germany.

The village has a population of 420.

Monuments 
 Medieval stone crosses (probably conciliation crosses)

References

Villages in Wrocław County